Medway High School may refer to:

Medway High School (Massachusetts)
Medway High School (Arva, Ontario)